Robert Hodgson may refer to:

Bob Hodgson ( 1946), English footballer - see 1945–46 Colchester United F.C. season
Robert Willard Hodgson (1893–1966), American botanist, taxonomist and agricultural researcher, specifically a citrus expert
Sir Robert Hodgson (judge) (1798–1880), Canadian lawyer, politician, judge, and Lieutenant Governor of Prince Edward Island, 1874–1879
Sir Robert Hodgson (diplomat) (1874–1956), British diplomat and consul
Robert Hodgson (cricketer) (born 1973), Australian cricketer
Robert D. Hodgson (1923–1979), American geographer
Robert K. Hodgson, Canadian thoroughbred trainer, see Canadian Horse Racing Hall of Fame
Robert Hodgson (priest) (1776–1844), Anglican Dean of Chester, 1815–1820 and of Carlisle, 1820–1844
Robert Hodgson (Archdeacon of Stafford) (1844–1917)